Orlando Lamon Robinson Jr. (born July 10, 2000) is an American professional basketball player for the Miami Heat of the National Basketball Association (NBA), on a two-way contract with the Sioux Falls Skyforce of the NBA G League. He played college basketball for the Fresno State Bulldogs.

High school career
Robinson began his high school career at Centennial High School in Las Vegas. Prior to his junior season, he transferred to Cathedral High School in Los Angeles and scored 29 points in his first game. Robinson attended Middlebrooks Academy for his senior season. On October 11, 2018, he committed to Fresno State over offers from Oregon State, Georgia Tech and Boise State.

College career
Robinson averaged 12.2 points and 6.6 rebounds per game as a freshman. In the offseason, he worked on his ballhandling and strength training in the midst of the COVID-19 pandemic. On January 4, 2021, he scored a career-high 33 points and had 13 rebounds in an 81–61 win against Wyoming. As a sophomore, Robinson averaged 14.6 points, 9.2 rebounds and 2.1 assists per game and had 11 double-doubles. He was named to the Second Team All-Mountain West and received CoSIDA Academic All-District honors. Following the season, Robinson declared for the 2021 NBA draft while maintaining his college eligibility. On July 2, 2021, he withdrew from the draft and returned to Fresno State for his junior season. Robinson was named to the First Team All-Mountain West as a junior.

Professional career

Miami Heat / Sioux Falls Skyforce (2022–present)
After going undrafted in the 2022 NBA draft, Robinson was signed by the Miami Heat on July 14, 2022. 

On October 24, 2022, Robinson joined the Sioux Falls Skyforce roster for training camp. On November 13, Robinson was signed to a two-way contract with the Miami Heat. He was waived by the Heat on November 25, and subsequently re-joined the Skyforce. However, on December 11, he signed a second two-way contract.

Career statistics

College

|-
| style="text-align:left;"| 2019–20
| style="text-align:left;"| Fresno State
| 30 || 30 || 27.3 || .492 || .250 || .705 || 6.6 || 1.6 || .8 || 1.0 || 12.2
|-
| style="text-align:left;"| 2020–21
| style="text-align:left;"| Fresno State
| 24 || 24 || 31.9 || .443 || .333 || .721 || 9.2 || 2.1 || .9 || .8 || 14.6
|-
| style="text-align:left;"| 2021–22
| style="text-align:left;"| Fresno State
| 36 || 36 || 33.2 || .484 || .352 || .716 || 8.4 || 2.9 || 1.0 || 1.2 || 19.4
|- class="sortbottom"
| style="text-align:center;" colspan="2"| Career
| 90 || 90 || 30.9 || .476 || .322 || .714 || 8.0 || 2.2 || .9 || 1.0 || 15.7

References

External links
Fresno State Bulldogs bio

2000 births
Living people
American men's basketball players
Basketball players from Nevada
Centers (basketball)
Fresno State Bulldogs men's basketball players
Miami Heat players
Sioux Falls Skyforce players
Sportspeople from Las Vegas
Undrafted National Basketball Association players